Durian pipit can refer to:

 Durio graveolens, which has a regional name of 'durian pipit'
 Durian Pipit, a mukim (administrative division) of Hulu Perak District, Malaysia